Spalding High School is located in Griffin, Georgia, United States.  It is part of the Griffin-Spalding County School System.  Its mascot is a jaguar and the school colors are blue and silver.

This is the third Spalding County school to have this name. The first Spalding High was built in 1929 and opened in 1930. It was located on Spalding Street, near the Dixie Highway and west of the city of Griffin. In 1943, the original building burned. In 1945, the second Spalding High was built. The first two schools were part of the Spalding County School System. In 1953, the Griffin and Spalding County school systems merged. As a result of the consolidation, the second Spalding High was closed.

Extra-curricular activities
Activities include: 
 Football
 Softball
 Cross country
 One Act Plays
 SHS Chorus
 Literary Club
 Air rifle
 Cheerleading
 Basketball
 Baseball
 Wrestling
 Track and field
 Soccer
 Golf
 Tennis
 Academic Team
 Newspaper
 Beta Club
 Bogarsettes
 Bogarsuns
 DIMA Club
 FBLA
 FHA
 4-H Club
 German Club
 Health Occupations Club
 Homecoming activities
 Future Problem Solvers
 Fellowship of Christian Students and Athletes
 Junior Classical League
 Key Club
 National Honors Society
 JROTC Color Guard
 JROTC Drill Team
 JROTC Raiders
 JROTC Rifle Team
 Science Club
 Math Team
 Student Council
 Dramatics and Thespians
 Y-Club
 Interact Club
 Swim Team
 SHS Band
 The Green Club
 Future Educators Association, aka Future Educators of America (FEA)
 FIRST Robotics

References

External links

 Spalding High School
 Griffin-Spalding County School System: Spalding High School
 Griffin-Spalding County School System

Public high schools in Georgia (U.S. state)
Schools in Spalding County, Georgia
Buildings and structures in Griffin, Georgia